Dalarna County is one of the 29 multi-member constituencies of the Riksdag, the national legislature of Sweden. The constituency was established as Kopparberg County in 1970 when the Riksdag changed from a bicameral legislature to a unicameral legislature. It was renamed Dalarna County in 1998. It is conterminous with the county of Dalarna. The constituency currently elects nine of the 349 members of the Riksdag using the open party-list proportional representation electoral system. At the 2022 general election it had 221,344 registered electors.

Electoral system
Dalarna County currently elects nine of the 349 members of the Riksdag using the open party-list proportional representation electoral system. Constituency seats are allocated using the modified Sainte-Laguë method. Only parties that that reach the 4% national threshold and parties that receive at least 12% of the vote in the constituency compete for constituency seats. Supplementary leveling seats may also be allocated at the constituency level to parties that reach the 4% national threshold.

Election results

Summary

(Excludes leveling seats)

Detailed

2020s

2022
Results of the 2022 general election held on 11 September 2022:

The following candidates were elected:
 Constituency seats - Anna-Lena Blomkvist (SD), 97 votes; Carl-Oskar Bohlin (M), 2,192 votes; Sofie Eriksson (S), 1,382 votes; Sara Gille (SD), 3 votes; Malin Höglund (M), 391 votes; Peter Hultqvist (S), 3,477 votes; Lars Isaksson (S), 1.423 votes; Ulrika Liljeberg (C), 595 votes; and Mats Nordberg (SD), 133 votes.
 Leveling seats - Mathias Bengtsson (KD), 439 votes; and Kajsa Fredholm (V), 440 votes.

2010s

2018
Results of the 2018 general election held on 9 September 2018:

The following candidates were elected:
 Constituency seats - Ann-Britt Åsebol (M), 407 votes; Carl-Oskar Bohlin (M), 2,812 votes; Patrik Engström (S), 420 votes; Peter Helander (C), 873 votes; Peter Hultqvist (S), 5,511 votes; Mats Nordberg (SD), 245 votes; Magnus Persson (SD), 5 votes; Daniel Riazat (V), 1,508 votes; and Maria Strömkvist (S), 513 votes.
 Leveling seats - Lars Adaktusson (KD), 1,158 votes.

2014
Results of the 2014 general election held on 14 September 2014:

The following candidates were elected:
 Constituency seats - Anders Ahlgren (C), 860 votes; Ulf Berg (M), 1,074 votes; Carl-Oskar Bohlin (M), 3,325 votes; Roza Güclü Hedin (S), 1,807 votes; Peter Hultqvist (S), 5,549 votes; Magnus Persson (SD), 2 votes; Sven-Olof Sällström (SD), 16 votes; Maria Strömkvist (S), 712 votes, and Hans Unander (S), 886 votes.
 Leveling seats - Jan Lindholm (MP), 392 votes; and Daniel Riazat (V), 1,198 votes.

2010
Results of the 2010 general election held on 19 September 2010:

The following candidates were elected:
 Constituency seats - Ann-Britt Åsebol (M), 1,855 votes; Ulf Berg (M), 1,952 votes; Carl-Oskar Bohlin (M), 1,333 votes; Roza Güclü Hedin (S), 1,802 votes; Peter Hultqvist (S), 7,168 votes; Kenneth Johansson (C), 1,416 votes; Kurt Kvarnström (S), 1,409 votes; Jan Lindholm (MP), 439 votes; William Petzäll (SD), 15 votes; and Carin Runeson (S), 849 votes.
 Leveling seats - Lena Olsson (V), 678 votes.

2000s

2006
Results of the 2006 general election held on 17 September 2006:

The following candidates were elected:
 Constituency seats - Ulf Berg (M), 782 votes; Rolf Gunnarsson (M), 4,832 votes; Peter Hultqvist (S), 6,221 votes; Kenneth Johansson (C), 1,627 votes; Kurt Kvarnström (S), 1,011 votes; Lena Olsson (V), 631 votes; Mikael Rosén (M), 440 votes; Carin Runeson (S), 372 votes; Anneli Särnblad (S), 1,278 votes; and Marita Ulvskog (S), 3,637 votes.
 Leveling seats - Camilla Lindberg (FP), 756 votes; Jan Lindholm (MP), 315 votes; and Lennart Sacrédeus (KD), 899 votes.

2002
Results of the 2002 general election held on 15 September 2002:

The following candidates were elected:
 Constituency seats - Lennart Fremling (FP), 1,083 votes; Per Erik Granström (S), 1,985 votes; Rolf Gunnarsson (M), 3,386 votes; Barbro Hietala Nordlund (S), 1,714 votes; Kenneth Johansson (C), 1,703 votes; Kurt Kvarnström (S), 1,514 votes; Ulrik Lindgren (KD), 905 votes; Anneli Särnblad (S), 1,247 votes; Marita Ulvskog (S), 6,528 votes; and Anders Wiklund (V), 1,031 votes.
 Leveling seats - Kerstin-Maria Stalín (MP), 637 votes.

1990s

1998
Results of the 1998 general election held on 20 September 1998:

The following candidates were elected:
 Constituency seats - Christel Anderberg (M), 3,363 votes; Hans Andersson (V), 2,742 votes; Laila Bäck (S), 1,461 votes; Ulf Björklund (KD), 682 votes; Per Erik Granström (S), 1,687 votes; Rolf Gunnarsson (M), 2,899 votes; Kenneth Johansson (C), 1,030 votes; Lena Olsson (V), 1,333 votes; Bengt-Ola Ryttar (S), 8,439 votes; and Marita Ulvskog (S), 4,110 votes.
 Leveling seats - Kerstin-Maria Stalín (MP), 1,005 votes.

1994
Results of the 1994 general election held on 18 September 1994:

1991
Results of the 1991 general election held on 15 September 1991:

1980s

1988
Results of the 1988 general election held on 18 September 1988:

1985
Results of the 1985 general election held on 15 September 1985:

1982
Results of the 1982 general election held on 19 September 1982:

1970s

1979
Results of the 1979 general election held on 16 September 1979:

1976
Results of the 1976 general election held on 19 September 1976:

1973
Results of the 1973 general election held on 16 September 1973:

1970
Results of the 1970 general election held on 20 September 1970:

References

Riksdag constituency
Riksdag constituencies
Riksdag constituencies established in 1970